Jean-Gabriel Castel  (born 21 June 1925) is a French and Canadian law professor and Professor Emeritus at Osgoode Hall Law School. He currently teaches a course at Osgoode in conflicts of law.

Biography 
Born in Nice, France, he served in the French Resistance during World War II receiving military decorations for his service. After the war, he received two law degrees in Paris. He was one of the first foreign Fulbright scholars. He received a J.D. in 1953 from the University of Michigan and a D. Juris. in 1958 from Harvard University.

From 1954 to 1959, he taught at the Faculty of Law of McGill University, where he served as the first Faculty Advisor to the McGill Law Journal. In 1959, he moved to Osgoode Hall Law School and taught there until his retirement in 1999. From 1957 to 1984, he was editor-in-chief of the Canadian Bar Review.

He is the author of Canadian Conflict of Laws, the leading Canadian work on the conflict of laws.

In 1985, he was made an Officer of the Order of Canada in recognition for being "known around the world as an authority on the subject of private international law". He is a Fellow of the Royal Society of Canada and a member of the Order of Ontario. He is an officer of the Légion d’Honneur and officer de l’Ordre national du Mérite.

References

Further reading
 

1925 births
Living people
Canadian legal scholars
Fellows of the Royal Society of Canada
French Resistance members
University of Michigan Law School alumni
Harvard Law School alumni
Officers of the Order of Canada
Officiers of the Légion d'honneur
Officers of the Ordre national du Mérite
Members of the Order of Ontario
People from Nice
Academic staff of York University
Academic staff of the Osgoode Hall Law School
Conflict of laws scholars
French expatriates in the United States
French emigrants to Canada